Centre Island or Center Island may refer to:

 Centre Island (Antarctica)
 Centre Island (Australia),  Sir Edward Pellew Group of Islands, Australia
 Centre Island, Toronto, Canada
Centre Island Docks
 Centre Island (Nunavut), Canada
 Centre Island, Falkland Islands
 Centre Island, Hong Kong
 Centre Island, New Zealand
 Centre Island (Te Anau), New Zealand
 Centre Island, New York, a village in Nassau County, New York, U.S.
 Center Island (New York), an island in Green Island village, Albany County, New York, U.S.
 Center Island (Washington), U.S.
Center Island Airport

See also
 Central Island, Kenya